The Battle of the Brazos is an American college football rivalry game between the Baylor Bears and Texas A&M Aggies.  The rivalry is named for the Brazos River that flows by the two schools, which are 90 miles apart.   The Battle of the Brazos debuted in 1899. The rivalry became dormant in 2012, when Texas A&M left the Big 12 Conference to join the Southeastern Conference.

History
In the early days of the rivalry (1905 and earlier), Baylor and Texas A&M played each other multiple times in a single year, possibly due to a dearth of regional opponents.  The two teams were also geographically close with only a one-hour train ride separating the two colleges. The term "Battle of the Brazos" was coined by former sports information director, Maxey Parrish.

The Brawl
The 1926 football game coincided with Baylor's homecoming. During halftime Baylor Homecoming floats paraded around the field. When a float – actually a car pulling a flatbed trailer with several female Baylor students – neared the section where the Texas A&M Corps of Cadets sat, a cadet raced towards the car and grabbed the steering wheel. The motion caused Louise Normand to fall off the truck, injuring her and inciting a large riot. Students began using metal folding chairs and planks of wood that had been used as yard markers for weapons. Texas A&M student Lt. Charles Sessums was hit in the head during the melee and, although he initially appeared to recover, he died following the game.

On December 8, 1926, the two school presidents agreed to temporarily suspend athletic relations between the schools. The schools would not compete against each other in any athletic event for the next four years. Baylor and Texas A&M would not meet in football again until 1931.

Pranks
In 1936 Baylor students awoke to find Texas A&M signs plastered across campus, with red paint applied to turn the Baylor flagpole into a barber pole. A huge sign on Waco Hall predicted, "A and M 50, Baylor 0."

It was once great sport before a big football matchup for Aggie students to drive to Waco with nefarious intentions of capturing Baylor's bear mascot. Baylor students sometimes resorted to extraordinary defensive measures. In 1946 they placed mascot Chita in the custody of Waco Police so the Aggies could not find her.

In the 1950s, two Aggie students drove to Waco and stole the Baylor mascot, a young bear cub, from the Baylor campus. While they were driving back to College Station in a brand–new car belonging to one of their families, the bear panicked.  Twenty–miles from Waco, the bear ripped out the inside of the car, and the boys set it free. The young men were caught when they took the car to be repaired.  The young cub did not survive its injuries. 

In 1954, Baylor mascot Nip and her trailer disappeared. Yet, the next day both the bear and trailer were found under a bridge on the highway to College Station.

In 2005 at Baylor Ballpark, a streaker carried a sign with "35–34" (in reference to Baylor defeating Texas A&M in football the previous fall) across right field. He was never caught, and the Bears went on to sweep Texas A&M in the series.

Baylor students likewise pranked the Aggies, often sneaking onto the Texas A&M campus to spray green paint on the statue of Lawrence Sullivan Ross. Ross was the third president of Texas A&M, who graduated from Baylor's two year college preparatory program.

Former U.S. House Majority Leader Tom DeLay was expelled from Baylor after he was in part found painting one of A&M's buildings green.

Football
The competitive peak of the series between Baylor and Texas A&M most likely occurred between 1960 and 1990 during which time Baylor won 13 games, A&M won 16 games, and two games ended in ties. During that same time period 18 of the 31 games played saw the final margin of victory to be 7 points or less. Texas Football magazine voted the 1986 game between the schools the Game of the Decade of the 80s in the Southwest Conference. Baylor led the game 17–0 in the 1st half and was positioned to score again when the Texas A&M defense was able to stop the Bears with a goal line stand.  The Aggies came back in the final minutes with an 80-yard drive resulting in a touchdown and a 31–30 victory.  The victory allowed them to claim the SWC Championship and advance to the Cotton Bowl for a second straight year. while Baylor finished in 2nd and ended the year with a victory over Colorado in the Bluebonnet Bowl.
Another exciting game was the 1978 contest in which little-known Baylor freshman Walter Abercrombie rushed for 207 yards in a 24–6 Baylor win in College Station. The 207 yards were a then NCAA record for rushing yardage in an initial game. In the 1980 contest Baylor won by the score of 46–7, going on that year to win the SWC Championship by a record 3 games and garnering a berth in the Cotton Bowl, where they were beaten by Alabama.

The thrilling 1986 A&M win began a period of domination in the series, in which Baylor did not beat A&M for 18 seasons (17 losses and a tie in 1990).  The most lopsided match in the history of the rivalry occurred in 2003 when the Aggies routed the Bears by a score of 73–10.  However, in 2004 an underdog Baylor Bear team defeated the No. 16 ranked Aggies 35–34 in overtime at Floyd Casey Stadium when the Bears converted a dramatic 2-point conversion on the final play of the game to earn their first win over the Aggies since 1985. The rivalry again became bitter in 2005 when the Aggies completed two fourth down conversions to win at home 16–13 in overtime.

The Baylor Bears defeated the Aggies for the second time in 5 years in 2008. Baylor has won 2 of the last 4 series games in Waco (2004 & 2008). In 2011 Texas A&M won the probable final meeting for the foreseeable future. With A&M's decision to leave the Big 12 Conference following the 2011 season, resumption of the series is not likely at this point unless the two schools meet in a post season bowl game.

Game results

Basketball
In men's basketball, Baylor and A&M have competed since the 1914–15 debut season of the Southwest Conference.  With 218 games played, A&M leads the series with 139 wins, 75 losses and 4 ties. Since the formation of the Big 12 the teams have followed somewhat parallel paths.  Both spent the early years of the conference as lower-division teams (they combined for one NIT appearance and zero NCAA appearances from 1996 to 2004, and both suffered winless conference seasons during that span).  However, in more recent years, they have grown into Big 12 contenders, with A&M reaching the NCAA's six straight years between 2006 and 2011 and Baylor making NCAA tourney appearances in 2008 before advancing all the way to the Elite 8 in 2010 and 2012. In 2011, Baylor did not reach postseason play but swept the series with the NCAA Tourney-Bound Aggies. After Texas A&M moved to the SEC in 2012, the Battle of the Brazos was put on hold. One of the more memorable games occurred on  Jan. 23, 2008 when Baylor defeated A&M 116-100 in a five overtime marathon in College Station. Both teams were nationally ranked. It is the longest game and most points scored in Big 12 history. The two schools scheduled out of conference games in 2014 and 2015, with each team winning on their home floor. In their most recent meeting, the #24 ranked Aggies beat the #16 Bears by a score of 80-61.

See also 
 List of NCAA college football rivalry games
 List of most-played college football series in NCAA Division I

References

College football rivalries in the United States
Baylor Bears football
Texas A&M Aggies football
1899 establishments in Texas